University of Engineering and Technology may refer to:

Bangladesh
 Bangladesh University of Engineering and Technology, Dhaka
 Bangladesh Army University of Engineering & Technology, Rajshahi
 Chittagong University of Engineering and Technology
 Dhaka University of Engineering & Technology, Gazipur
 Khulna University of Engineering and Technology
 Rajshahi University of Engineering and Technology

India
 Jaypee University of Engineering and Technology, Madhya Pradesh

Pakistan
 Balochistan University of Engineering and Technology, Khuzdar, Balochistan
 Dawood University of Engineering and Technology, Karachi, Sindh
 Mehran University of Engineering and Technology, Jamshoro, Sindh
 Muhammad Nawaz Sharif University of Engineering and Technology, Multan, Punjab
 NED University of Engineering and Technology, Karachi, Sindh
 Sir Syed University of Engineering and Technology, Karachi, Sindh
 University of Engineering and Technology, Lahore, Punjab
 University of Engineering and Technology, Mardan, Khyber-Pakhtunkhwa
 University of Engineering and Technology, Peshawar, Khyber-Pakhtunkhwa
 University of Engineering and Technology, Rasul, Punjab
 University of Engineering and Technology, Taxila, Punjab

Peru
 University of Engineering and Technology (Peru), Lima